South Melbourne Town Hall is a civic building located on Bank Street in South Melbourne, a suburb of Melbourne, Victoria, Australia.  It is of state heritage significance to Victoria being listed on the Victorian Heritage Register (H0217).

History
The Town Hall was built between 1879–80 to the design of noted Melbourne architect Charles Webb.

It was built to house what was then known as the Emerald Hill Town Council, as well as a Public Hall, a Mechanics Institute and Library, the Post and Telegraph Department, the Police Department and Courthouse and Fire Brigade.

In the 1930s some interior elements were refurbished and new council chamber furniture was installed, designed by Oakley and Parkes.

The Town Hall was built on an elevated site, the centrepiece of a formally planned block, with a forecourt in the form of a small curved park. It was built in the Victorian Academic Classical style with French Second Empire features, dominated by a very tall multi-stage clock tower.

The building is on the Victorian Heritage Register, along with the park and the 1905 Boer War memorial in front.

In 1994, the Cities of South Melbourne, Port Melbourne and St Kilda were amalgamated to form the new City of Port Phillip. The new council administration was centred at the St Kilda Town Hall, with only secondary offices retained at the South Melbourne Town Hall.

That same year, the Federal Government created the Australian National Academy of Music (ANAM), which became the main occupant of the building. ANAM is the national centre for the further development of musicians with outstanding talent in Australia, and the hall has become a concert venue.

The building was restored in 2004 thanks to a state government heritage grant, enabling the reinstatement of the decorative roof and iron cresting (removed in 1945), and restoration of the original ochre exterior colour.

In 2012 Multicultural Arts Victoria, Victoria's peak arts organisation promoting cultural diversity in the arts, moved their home to the South Melbourne Town Hall.

In 2018, a significant parts of the internal roof collapsed parts of the building for many months whilst significant construction works were carried out. (Earlier that year, substantial works were completed on updating the lift which broke down frequently.)

Gallery

See also
 List of town halls in Melbourne

References

External links

Town halls in Melbourne
Heritage-listed buildings in Melbourne
Government buildings completed in 1880
Victorian architecture in Victoria (Australia)
1880 establishments in Australia
Buildings and structures in the City of Port Phillip
Clock towers in Australia